Lower St. Regis Lake is a part of the St. Regis River in the Adirondacks in northern New York State. At its northern edge is Paul Smith's College, former site of Paul Smith's Hotel. Along with Upper St. Regis Lake and Spitfire Lake, it became famous in the late 19th century as a summer playground of America's power elite, drawn to the area by its scenic beauty and by the rustic charms of Paul Smith's Hotel.  It is the site of a small chapel, originally built of logs, St. John's in the Wilderness, that was formerly attended by well-dressed families that arrived in canoes, rowboats and sailboats.

Paul Smith's College maintains several lean-tos on the lake.  The college is the start of two famous canoe routes—the Seven Carries and the Nine Carries.

The lake lies in the town of Brighton.

Human History 
Before any settlements arrived on Lower St. Regis Lake, the lake was used for recreational purposes and as a food source. In 1858 Paul Smith bought land on Lower St Regis Lake. Smith wanted to create a place for families to stay while he took the fathers and husbands out hunting. As a result, the St. Regis House was created. However, this house was not big enough for his guests, so he expanded the house to create the Paul Smith's Hotel. As the hotel continued to grow a sawmill was added as well as 3  golf courses. The hotel brought many tourists to the area to experience the great Adirondack Park. Wealthy families who came to visit Paul Smith's Hotel then decided to build their own houses and camps on the lake. Due to new settlements the overall development of Lower St. Regis increased 5 times its previous amount. In 1946, Paul Smith's Hotel made a transition into Paul Smith's College. Paul Smith's College has remained in that location since then. As a result of all these settlements, the Lower St. Regis Lake experienced extreme cases of eutrophication. This was due to families dumping wastewater from bathrooms and kitchens straight into the lake. Important homeowners such as Dr. E.L Trudeau, Phelps Smith, and Dr. Walter B. James were 

determined to help save the declining lake health by ensuring wastewater was disposed of properly instead of being dumped in the lake. In addition, building any structure closer than 30ft from the shore was prohibited.

Hydrology 
Lower St. Regis Lake is part of the St. Regis Chain of Lakes. Water flows north from Upper St. Regis Lake, through Spitfire Lake, and finally through a 2,000 foot long channel known as the "the slough" into Lower St. Regis Lake. The lake has a surface area of 350 acres and has a maximum depth of 38 feet. Lower St. Regis Lake's water level was impacted in 1851 when a dam was built to power a sawmill.

Watershed Characteristics 
The watershed area is 5,363 ha with the lake perimeter being 7.1 km. There are 10 km of state roads and 13.4 km of state roads that run through it. The watershed area consists of 35% deciduous forest, 28% evergreen forest, 3% mixed forest, 13% wetlands, 17% surface water, and 3% residential area.

Current biological communities 
The current biological community of Lower Saint Regis can be defined as warm water aquatic ecosystem due to the changes caused by human development (<Richlin et al, 2018>). The biological community contains many flora and fauna, from microorganisms to large vertebrates. This page will focus on large vertebrates and invasive species such as Fish, birds, and mammals. The fish communities include species like Yellow Perch, Northern Pike, Largemouth bass, Smallmouth bass, Pumpkinseed,  Rock bass,  Brown bullhead, and others (plant et al, 2020). The birds and mammals that can be spotted on the lake, including but not limited to are Loons , ducks, Canada geese, RIver otter, Fisher, and  North American beaver (<Richlin et al, 2018>). Aquatic invasive species. There are no observed aquatic invasive species in the St. Regis waterway system (Regalado et al., 2017).

Recreation
Lower St. Regis Lake is located in Paul Smiths, New York and is a part of the St. Regis Canoe Area which is the only designated canoe area in New York State. Lower St. Regis Lake is a part of the seven carries which occupies the major water bodies of the St. Regis Canoe Area. Lower St. Regis Lake has been a popular location for recreation and leisure in the Adirondacks since Paul Smith’s moved to this region in the mid-1800's. Lower St. Regis Lake mainly used by visitors for fishing, canoeing, and the use of Adirondack guideboat. Since the 1970's, Lower St. Regis Lake has gone through a large ecological shift in its water quality that has affected the fisheries and the aesthetic of the lake. The Adirondack Watershed Institute  with help from Paul Smith’s College have been monitoring Lower St. Regis Lake to maintain healthy water quality levels.

Lower St. Regis Lake has a large visitor population, primarily during the summer months. Recreational activities such as boating, paddling, fishing, and camping are the most popular that occur on the lake during peak summer season. Other recreational activities that occur off the water body are hiking, photography, birding, and hunting. During the winter season when the lake is frozen snowmobiling, ice fishing, and cross country skiing are the predominant recreational activities that occur. Lower St. Regis Lake's recreation community participates in a range of different sports and activities all year round. Lower St. Regis Lake has access to backcountry camping and access by paddling to other parts of the St. Regis Canoe Area which appeal to visitors. Lower St. Regis Lake has been known for recreational activities by visitors in the Northern Adirondacks.

Natural History

Lower St. Regis Lake was generally unimpacted by human activity until 1958, when Apollos A. (“Paul”) Smith arrived and began construction on the hotel. The building of the hotel, the influx of new houses and the increase in traffic had a great impact on the water quality of the lake. In the 19th century the hotel and surrounding cottages were dumping sewage along with wastewater produced by guests into cesspools and then it eventually made it’s way to the lake. Wastewater may contain high levels of nutrients that promote algae blooms and problems to the ecosystems such as decreased availability of sunlight. In the 1970’s there were thick blooms of cyanobacteria in the lake which was a result of the grey water contamination.

In the year 1907 Paul Smith purchased a dam which was originally used to run a sawmill He used this dam to raise the level of the lake in order to store water for hydropower. In the 19th century many spruce and white pine around the lake were cut down in order to build three golf courses, which affected the water quality of Lower St Regis Lake. Unpaved roads near the lake also affected the lake’s water quality is that they typically contain sodium and chloride concentrations less than 0.55 and .24 mg/L which has an effect on the lakes water quality.

Due to all the negative impacts of pollution the Lowe St Regis Lake property owners started to become concerned within the water quality in the early 20th century. As a result, they signed a resolution to ban draining sewage and or wastewater into the lake. Even with the efforts to help the lake the water quality still was declining. The efforts of cleaning the water continue into the current day. Paul Smiths College currently has a sewage treatment plant where is filtered the lake water by holding solid waste and filtering the water to be cleaner. The Adirondack Water Shed is also a group which is active in helping restore the lake. Over all there is a lot of efforts to help restore the lake quality but the water quality may never return to the way it was before humans started to pollute it.

References

Sources

 Donaldson, Alfred L., A History of the Adirondacks. New York: Century, 1921. ISBN 0-916346-26-9. (reprint)
 Jerome, Christine Adirondack Passage: Cruise of Canoe Sairy Gamp, HarperCollins, 1994. ISBN 0-935272-94-1. Plant, Zoe, Firkins Thomas. Capito Julie, Marshall Benjamin (2020) The Lower St. Regis Lake Shoreline: Understanding the Past, Analyzing the Present, and Recommendations for the Future. Paul Smith’s college. Found in capstone data base in Paul smith’s college library services.

External Links
New York Times, "Worship in the Wilderness", July 8, 1906. (pdf)

Adirondacks
Lakes of New York (state)
Lakes of Franklin County, New York